This is a list of the major public architectural sculpture of German sculptor Otto Lessing (1846–1912). Paintings and private commissions are not (yet) included.

Sources
 Jörg Kuhn: Otto Lessing (1846–1912). Sculptor, Artisan, Painter. The Life and Work of a Sculptor of late Historicism, in Particular His Architectural Sculpture.   Dissertation, Freie Universität Berlin, 1994.

Lessing
Lessing
Lessing, Otto